Ivanna is a 2022 Indonesian horror thriller directed by Kimo Stamboel and written by Lele Laila, starring Caitlin Halderman, Jovarel Callum, Junior Roberts, Shandy William, and Sonia Alyssa. The film story is adapted from a novel written by Risa Saraswati and the film is the Spin-off from Danur 2: Maddah and part of Danur universe. The movie was released for worldwide audience on Amazon Prime Video.

Plot 
When Ambar and Dika moved away after their parents’ death, the siblings never thought of what was supposedly a new start turns into the beginning of their lives’ biggest misery. All fueled by Ambar’s ability to sense the unseen that she got after she went through impaired vision. Contrasting to the warm welcome they got at Panti Jompo, Ambar earned an eerie vision of the past. She found out that there has been a slaughter in the very same house many years ago. A Dutch lady entity, Ivanna, appeared in Ambar’s vision, giving her a glimpse of the tragedy where she got decapitated by a vile imperialist.

On the day of Eid al-Fitr, grandma Ani is found dead in a gruesome pool of blood, beheaded. Ambar figured that the tragedy could be related to the earlier discovery of a chest filled with trinkets and a headless statue in the basement of the nursing house’s pavilion. Now, Ambar has to solve the vengeance of the entity that is slowly creeping into their lives, even for their heads.

Cast  
 Caitlin Halderman as Ambar
 Jovarel Callum as Dika
 Junior Roberts as Arthur
 Shandy William as Agus
 Sonia Alyssa as Ivanna van Dijk
 Taskya Namya as Rina
 Yayu Unru as Kakek Farid
 Rina Hasyim as Oma Ida
 Yati Surachman as Nenek Ani
 Tanta Ginting as Yudi
 Muhammad Khan as Syaiful
 Hiroaki Kato as Matsuya
 Kenes Andari as Wati

Reception

Box Office 
Ivanna was one of the most box office successfully in Indonesia, on the first week Ivanna garnered more than one million ticket sales. At the end of its domestic theatrical run, it ended up with 2.7 million admissions with an estimated grossed Rp125 billion (US$8.5 million) making it the fourth highest grossing domestic film in 2022.

References

External links 
 
 Ivanna on YouTube

Indonesian horror thriller films
Indonesian supernatural horror films
Indonesian horror films
2022 films
2022 horror films
Indonesian ghost films